Chromobacteriosis infections are a cutaneous condition caused by chromobacteria characterized by fluctuating abscesses.

See also 
 Aeromonas infection
 Skin lesion

References 

Bacterium-related cutaneous conditions